The following is a list of squads for each nation competing in football at the 2014 Central American and Caribbean Games in Veracruz.

Group A

Mexico
Head coach: Leonardo Cuéllar

Haiti

Trinidad and Tobago

Colombia
Head coach: Fabián Taborda

Group B

Costa Rica
Head coach:  Garabet Avedissian

Nicaragua
Head coach:  Antonio Macías

Dominican Republic
Head coach: Rufino Sotolongo

Venezuela
Head coach:  Kenneth Zseremeta

Women
2014